Alan Leslie Jarvis  (4 August 1943 – 15 December 2019) was a  Welsh international footballer.

Career
He played for Everton, Hull City and Mansfield Town; while at Hull City he played 159 matches for the Tigers between 1964 and 1970, scoring 12 goals. He was part of the promotion-winning Hull City side of season 1965-66.

He was part of the Wales national football team between 1966 and 1967, playing 3 matches. He played his first match on 22 October 1966 against Scotland  and his last match on 12 April 1967 against Northern Ireland.

After retiring, he returned to North Wales to work as a quantity surveyor.

Personal life
In 2014, it was revealed that Jarvis was in a care home in North Wales, having been diagnosed with an unknown form of dementia. His daughter was quoted as saying her family believed he was suffering from Chronic traumatic encephalopathy (CTE). He died on 15 December 2019 in Mold, Flintshire at the age of 76.

His family subsequently donated his brain to medical research being undertaken by Dr William Stuart, a consultant neuropathologist based at the University of Glasgow. In May 2020, at the opening of an inquest into his death at Ruthin, a coroner said it could linked to heading a football and be regarded as an "industrial disease". Coroner John Gittins finally concluded that Jarvis died from Alzheimer's "caused by his occupation as a footballer, heading heavy footballs".

See also
 List of Wales international footballers (alphabetical)

References

External links

1943 births
2019 deaths
Footballers from Wrexham
Welsh footballers
Wales international footballers
Hull City A.F.C. players
Everton F.C. players
Mansfield Town F.C. players
English Football League players
Association football midfielders